Abraham Remy Charlip (January 10, 1929 – August 14, 2012) was an American artist, writer, choreographer, theatre director, theatrical designer, and teacher. He wrote or illustrated more than 40 children's books.

Life and career

Charlip was raised in the Brownsville neighborhood of Brooklyn by Lithuanian Jewish parents.

He studied textile design at Straubenmuller Textile High School in Manhattan, and fine arts at Cooper Union in New York, graduating in 1949. In 1951, he began attending Black Mountain College in North Carolina at the encouragement of Lou Harrison, arriving on Thanksgiving 1951 together with composer David Tudor and writer and potter M.C. Richards. At Black Mountain College, he collaborated with composer John Cage, participated in Theatre Piece No. 1, and became a founding member of the Merce Cunningham Dance Company, for which he also designed sets and costumes. He remained a member of the Merce Cunningham Dance Company for 11 years. He also met others with whom he would later collaborate, including Robert Rauschenberg, Nicholas Cernovich, and Vera Baker Williams.

In the 1960s Charlip created a unique form of choreography, which he called "Air Mail Dances." He would send a set of drawings to a dance company, and the dancers would then order the positions and create transitions and context, without Charlip's further participation.

He directed plays for the Judson Poets Theatre, co-founded the Paper Bag Players children's theater company, and served as head of the Children's Theater and Literature Department at Sarah Lawrence College. Off-Broadway, he was the "Stage Director" of a 1962 production of Bertolt Brecht's Man Is Man for Julian Beck's Living Theatre, for which he received his first of two Obie Awards, and designed the set for the American Place Theatre production of Paul Goodman's Jonah in 1966.

As a children's book illustrator and author, he became known for his unique use of line and color, fanciful prose, and postmodern use of narrative sequence and continuity. He won three New York Times Best Illustrated Book of the Year citations, and was awarded a six-month residency in Kyoto, Japan from the Japan/U.S. Commission on the Arts.

Charlip was the model for illustrations of Georges Méliès in the book The Invention of Hugo Cabret, written and illustrated by Brian Selznick.

He moved to San Francisco in 1989, and worked with local arts groups, including the Oakland Ballet. He died in San Francisco in 2012. He was interred at Fernwood Cemetery in Mill Valley, California.

Choreography
 Meditation (solo, 1966)
 A Week's Notice (duet, 1977)
 Art of the Dance (solo, 1977)
 Travel Sketches (solo, 1977)
 Glow Worm (quartet, 1977)
 Dance in Bed (solo)
 April (Judson Dance Theatre)
 December (Judson Dance Theatre)

Children's books
1956 Dress Up and Let's Have a Party.  Scott.
1957 Where is Everybody?.  Scott.
1957 It Looks Like Snow Greenwillow, reprint 2000, On Dirait Qu'il Neige
1962 The Tree Angel Knopf.
1964 Fortunately. Parents Magazine Press. Reprinted by Scholastic Book Services in 1969 with the Title What Good Luck! What Bad Luck!
1966 Mother, Mother, I Feel Sick, Send for the Doctor, Quick, Quick, Quick. Four Winds Press
1969  Arm in Arm (A Collection of Connections, Endless Tales, Reiterations, and other Echolalia).  .
1973 Harlequin and the Gift of Many Colors.
1975  Thirteen, with Jerry Joyner. Four Winds Press/MacMillan Publishing
1987  Handtalk Birthday Four Winds Press
1999 Peanut Butter Party. Tricycle Press.
1999  Sleepytime Rhyme. Tricycle Press. Greenwillow Books. 
2000  Why I Will Never Ever Ever Ever Have Enough Time to Read This Book.  Tricycle Press.
2007 A Perfect Day. Greenwillow Books. .

References
Notes

Sources
"Young at Heart: A Celebration of Remy Charlip" in the Library of Congress LC Information Bulletin, June 23, 1997
Remy Charlip at WorldCat.org

External links

  – The Remy Charlip Estate
The Paper Bag Players, co-founded by Charlip

 
Review of Air Mail Dances by The New Yorker Magazine

1929 births
2012 deaths
American male writers
American choreographers
American children's book illustrators
Cooper Union alumni
Artists from San Francisco
Writers from San Francisco
Artists from New York City
Writers from New York City
20th-century American writers
21st-century American writers
Black Mountain College alumni